Fudges Creek is an unincorporated community in Cabell County, West Virginia, United States.

The community takes its name from nearby Fudges Creek.

References 

Unincorporated communities in West Virginia
Unincorporated communities in Cabell County, West Virginia